Alexander Valeryevich Khalifman (born 18 January 1966) is a Russian chess player and writer. Awarded the title of Grandmaster by FIDE in 1990, he was FIDE World Chess Champion in 1999.

Early life 
Alexander Khalifman was born in St Petersburg into a family of engineers. Khalifman's grandfather was the director of the Chaliapin Museum; the other half of the family came from the Baltics. According to family legend, Khalifman's ancestor was one of the commanders of Russian monitor Rusalka.

Tournament career 
Khalifman won the 1982 Soviet Union Youth Championship, the 1984 Soviet Union Youth Championship, the 1985 European Under-20 Championship in Groningen, the 1985 and 1987 Moscow championships, 1990 Groningen, 1993 Ter Apel, 1994 Chess Open of Eupen, 1995 Chess Open St. Petersburg, the Russian Championship in 1996, the Saint Petersburg Championship in 1996 and 1997, 1997 Chess Grand Master Tournament St. Petersburg, 1997 Aarhus, 1997 and 1998 Bad Wiessee, 2000 Hoogeveen.

He was a member of the gold medal-winning Russian team at the Chess Olympiads in 1992, 2000 and 2002, and at the 1997 World Team Chess Championship.

Khalifman gained the Grandmaster title in 1990 with one particularly good early result being his first place in the 1990 New York City Open ahead of a host of strong players. His most notable achievement was winning the FIDE World Championship in 1999, a title he held until the following year. He was rated 44th in the world at the time, while "Classical" World Champion Garry Kasparov was rated No. 1. Khalifman said after the tournament, "Rating systems work perfectly for players who play only in round robin closed events. I think most of them are overrated. Organizers invite same people over and over because they have the same rating and their rating stays high." Khalifman played in the Linares chess tournament next year, and performed credibly (though placing below joint winner Kasparov).

Coaching 
With his trainer Gennady Nesis (de) he runs a chess academy in St. Petersburg, called "The Grandmaster Chess School", since November 1998. Khalifman has been coaching Vladimir Fedoseev since 2011.

Khalifman has been coaching the Azerbaijani national team since 2013 and is its captain.

In March 2022, he signed an open letter of Russian GMs
to Vladimir Putin urging him to stop war in Ukraine.

Books 

 Alexander Khalifman (2000–2002). Opening for White according to Kramnik 1.♘f3 (5 volumes). Chess Stars
 Alexander Khalifman (2003–2012). Opening for White according to Anand 1. e4 (14 volumes). Chess Stars
 Alexander Khalifman (2006–2011). Opening for White according to Kramnik 1.♘f3 (revised edition, 5 volumes). Chess Stars

See also
 List of Jewish chess players

References

External links 
 
 
 
 
 Chess puzzles from the games of Alexander Khalifman
 
 
 Interview with Alexander Khalifman (2008)
 Two part interview with Alexander Khalifman (2010): Part 1, Part 2

1966 births
Living people
World chess champions
Chess grandmasters
Chess Olympiad competitors
Russian chess players
Soviet chess players
Jewish chess players
Russian chess writers
National team coaches
Russian Jews
Sportspeople from Saint Petersburg
Chess coaches
Russian activists against the 2022 Russian invasion of Ukraine